Stefano Felice Ficatelli (8 April 1686 – 5 September 1771) was an Italian painter of the late Baroque period.

Biography
He was born in Cento. He is described as a fertile copyist of Guercino works, who painted for churches in Ferrara.

He was the son of Giuseppe Maria (1639 – 1703) of Cento, from whom he inherited a studio, and who had trained with Cesare Gennari, Guercino's nephew. His brother Paolo Antonio was also a painter and copyist of Guercino.

References

1686 births
1771 deaths
18th-century Italian painters
Italian male painters
Italian Baroque painters
18th-century Italian male artists